Holocaust (1978) is an American four-part television miniseries which explores the Holocaust from the perspectives of the fictional Weiss family, a family of Jews in Germany, and the perspective of a rising member of the SS, who gradually becomes a war criminal. Holocaust highlights numerous events which occurred both up to and during World War II, such as Kristallnacht, the construction of Jewish ghettos, and, later, the construction of death camps and the use of gas chambers.

Even though the miniseries won several awards, and it also received positive reviews, it was also criticized. In The New York Times, Holocaust survivor and political activist Elie Wiesel wrote that it was: "Untrue, offensive, cheap: As a TV production, the film is an insult to those who perished and to those who survived." However, the series played a major role in public debates on the Holocaust in West Germany after its showing in 1979, and its impact has been described as "enormous".

Format
The series was presented in four parts on NBC:
 Part 1: The Gathering Darkness (original airdate: April 16, 1978)
 Part 2: The Road to Babi Yar (original airdate: April 17, 1978)
 Part 3: The Final Solution (original airdate: April 18, 1978)
 Part 4: The Saving Remnant (original airdate: April 19, 1978)

Plot

Holocaust is an account of two fictional German families from Berlin, prior to, and during World War II: one is Christian, whose members become Nazis out of economic necessity, and the other is Jewish, who become their victims.

The "Aryan" Dorf family is headed by Erik (Michael Moriarty), a lawyer who struggles to find work to support his wife Marta (Deborah Norton) and two young children, Peter and Laura, during the economic hardships of the Depression in Germany. At his wife's insistence, Erik joins the Nazi Party to earn income. He rapidly advances within the SS and becomes the right-hand man of Reinhard Heydrich (David Warner), a top-level Nazi and one of the engineers of the "Final Solution". Coordinating mass murder disturbs Dorf at first, but he grows increasingly merciless as he discovers that ideological fervor gains him prestige. This backfires after a feud with SS field officers who resent his orders and they send an anonymous letter to Heydrich, accusing Dorf of having Communist sympathies. These accusations stunt his career. After Heydrich is assassinated in 1942, Dorf is put in charge of major extermination operations at Nazi death camps. Dorf continues to follow orders, and commits  horrific war crimes while covering them up.

The series also follows the Weiss family; a group of moderately wealthy German Jews, headed by Dr. Josef Weiss (Fritz Weaver) a Polish-born general physician. His German-born wife, Berta (Rosemary Harris), a talented pianist, is descended from a "Hoch-Deutsch" family whose ancestors were ethnic German "court Jews". They have three children—Karl (James Woods), an artist who is married to a Christian woman named Inga (Meryl Streep); Rudi, (Joseph Bottoms), a football player; and 16-year-old daughter Anna Weiss (Blanche Baker). Berta's parents are also featured.

Holocaust begins in 1935 in Berlin, with the wedding of Karl Weiss and Inga Helms. The unemployed Erik and his sickly wife Marta consult with Dr. Josef Weiss who diagnoses her with a heart murmur. They learn the doctor had treated Erik's parents and him as a child.

This miniseries spans the period from 1938 to 1945 and covers the unfolding of the Holocaust, the events from Kristallnacht to the Warsaw Ghetto Uprising, and the Sobibor death camp revolt, and ultimately the end of World War II and the liberation of the camps. It portrays the crimes of the Nazis, including the "Action T4" euthanasia murders of the disabled, the Babi Yar massacre, the deportations to and imprisonment in the ghettos, and the murders of millions in the death camps. Throughout the series, each member of the Weiss (and Palitz) family suffers hardships and ultimately meets a terrible fate.

The Kristallnacht attacks in November 1938 were ostensibly in retaliation for the assassination of Nazi official Ernst vom Rath by Jewish 17-year-old Herschel Grynszpan. Much was staged and supported by the Nazis, as part of their economic and political persecution of Jews. So too it was, for the fictional Weiss (and Palitz) family.

Within days artist Karl Weiss is arrested and sent to Buchenwald concentration camp. Heinrich Palitz and his wife are forced to move in with their daughter, Berta, son-in-law Josef Weiss, and their two younger children still at home.

Dr. Josef Weiss already prohibited from treating "Aryan" patients, is deported to Poland as a foreign Polish citizen, along with Jewish patients Franz Lowy (George Rose) and his wife Chana (Käte Jaenicke). Josef's brother, Moses Weiss owns a pharmacy in Warsaw, and finds a place for the couple to stay. Josef starts working as a doctor in the Warsaw Ghetto hospital. In Berlin, Berta, and their children are forced to sell their home and Josef's clinic. They move into their daughter-in-law Inga's apartment, relying on her and her reluctant, even hostile, Nazi-supporting family for their survival.

Rudi runs away, trying to escape the Nazis' reach. Anna is raped by German SA stormtroopers. Nearly catatonic as a result, she is committed to Hadamar. She and others suffering from mental illness are killed under the Nazi Action T4. Eventually, Berta is deported from Berlin to Warsaw, where she reunites with her husband Josef. She teaches in the ghetto school, and Josef and Moses become members of the Judenrat (Jewish council) for the Ghetto.

Inga tries to contact Karl in Buchenwald, to no avail. Through a friend of Inga's family, Heinz Müller (Tony Haygarth), an SS officer stationed at Buchenwald, Inga is able to get letters to and from Karl, but only if she has sex with Müller. Inga initially refuses out of loyalty to Karl. When Müller threatens to have Karl keep doing heavy labor at risk of death, Inga submits to him, hoping to save Karl's life. Müller uses Inga's sexual contact with him to taunt Karl; he does arrange for an easier indoor job, and then transfer to Theresienstadt to work in its art studio.

Rudi Weiss reaches German-occupied Prague, Czechoslovakia, where he meets Helena Slomova (Tovah Feldshuh), whose parents have been deported. They fall in love and run away together, witnessing the Babi Yar massacre in Ukraine and meeting up with Jewish partisans. Rudi and Helena fight with them for years. When an attempted ambush of German troops fails, Rudi's partisans are annihilated, and Helena is killed. Rudi is sent to Sobibór death camp.  He meets Leon Feldhandler and Alexander Pechersky, and escapes with them during the Sobibór uprising in October 1943. He decides to try to find his family in Europe.

Meanwhile, in the Warsaw ghetto, the Weisses and others learn about the death camps and join a resistance movement. They try to save lives in any way possible. Josef uses his position as doctor in the Ghetto hospital to rescue Jews from the trains by claiming they have contagious illnesses. Moses Weiss and others stockpile weapons bought outside the ghetto. Eventually Josef is caught and he and Berta, along with Franz and Chana Lowy, are deported to Auschwitz.

On Passover of 1943, Moses and the others revolt against the Germans entering the ghetto for a last action, so they can determine their own deaths. Although they have some success, the SS eventually overwhelm the defenders, crushing the Warsaw Ghetto Uprising and burning down most of the buildings. When Moses and the other survivors surrender to SS forces, they are immediately killed by firing squads.

When Karl reaches Theresienstadt, he is commissioned as an artist. Inga sacrifices her freedom in order to reunite with Karl, and is sent to Theresienstadt where she becomes pregnant with Karl's child. Theresienstadt is kept as a showplace to fool Red Cross observers, but Karl begins secretly drawing the reality of the concentration camps. The SS learns of the art when one of the artists sells several works. SS, including Erik Dorf, and Theresienstadt officials, need to find out if more of these drawings exist, as they threaten their subterfuge. The artists are severely tortured but refuse to confess. Karl, the sole survivor of the arrested artists, is deported to Auschwitz, after learning that Inga is pregnant with their child.

Both of Karl's parents are killed in Auschwitz shortly before the liberation of the camp. Berta is last seen entering a gas chamber. Josef had been working on a road crew but Dorf reminds his superiors that Jews should not be used for slave labor when non-Jewish prisoners are available. Josef is also killed in the gas chamber. Karl is found dead in his barracks, after one final sketch.

After the war ends, Dorf is captured by the United States Army and told that he will be tried for war crimes. Dorf protests, saying that he was mostly an observer, and that Nazi actions were legitimate. Confronted by evidence to the contrary, Dorf commits suicide by taking a cyanide pill.

Rudi meets Inga after Theresienstadt is liberated, having learned about the deaths of his parents and Karl. Inga says she had their baby and named him Josef, after her father-in-law. She plans to return with Josef to Berlin, but says she won't stay there. Rudi is commissioned with smuggling Jewish orphans into Palestine. Karl's drawings, which had been hidden from the SS by Inga, were given to a museum in Prague as a permanent record of the Holocaust.

Cast

 Fritz Weaver as Josef Weiss
 Joseph Bottoms as Rudi Weiss
 Michael Moriarty as Erik Dorf
 Deborah Norton as Marta Dorf
 David Warner as Reinhard Heydrich
 T. P. McKenna as SS Standartenführer Paul Blobel
 Tovah Feldshuh as Helena Slomova
 Marius Goring as Heinrich Palitz
 Rosemary Harris as Berta Palitz Weiss
 Ian Holm as Heinrich Himmler
 Lee Montague as Uncle Sasha

 George Rose as Mr Lowy
 Robert Stephens as Uncle Kurt Dorf
 Meryl Streep as Inga Helms Weiss
 James Woods as Karl Weiss 
 Blanche Baker as Anna Weiss
 Sam Wanamaker as Moses Weiss
 Michael Beck as Hans Helms
 Tony Haygarth as Heinz Muller
 Tom Bell as Adolf Eichmann
Cyril Shaps as KZ Inmate Weinberg

Production
Holocaust was produced by Robert Berger, and it was filmed on location in Austria and West Berlin. It was broadcast in four parts from April 16 to April 19, 1978. The series  earned a 49% market share; it was also well received in Europe.

The 9½ hour program starred Fritz Weaver, Meryl Streep, James Woods, and Michael Moriarty, as well as a large supporting cast. It was directed by Marvin J. Chomsky, whose credits included ABC's miniseries Roots (1977). The teleplay was written by novelist-producer Gerald Green, who later adapted the script as a novel.

The miniseries was rebroadcast on NBC from September 10 to September 13, 1979.

Home media
In the U.S., Holocaust was released as a Region 1 DVD by Paramount Pictures and CBS Home Entertainment on May 27, 2008. The release of the Region 2 DVD followed on 15 August 2010.
A disclaimer on the DVD packaging states that it may be edited from the original network broadcast version and it is shorter at 446 mins. The Region 4 DVD is unusually in native NTSC format, not having been converted to PAL. No information about the cut in footage has been released.

In the U.S. and Canada, a 452-minute version was released as a 2-disc Blu-ray set on September 24, 2019.

Reception
Some critics accused the miniseries of trivializing the Holocaust. The television format was believed to limit how realistic the portrayal could be. In addition, the fact that NBC made a financial gain as a result of advertising resulted in charges that it had commercialized a vast tragedy. The producers of the series rebutted these charges by stating that it educated the public by raising its awareness of the Holocaust. With the exception of films such as The Diary of Anne Frank (1959), Judgment at Nuremberg (1961), and The Hiding Place (1975), this was the first time in which many Americans had seen a lengthy dramatization of the Holocaust.

The television critic Clive James commended the production. Writing in The Observer (reprinted in his collection The Crystal Bucket), he commented:

The historian Tony Judt described the series as "the purest product of American commercial television - its story simple, its characters mostly two-dimensional, its narrative structured for maximum emotional impact" and he also wrote  that, when it is shown in Continental Europe, it was "execrated and abominated by European cinéastes from Edgar Reitz to Claude Lanzmann" and he responded to these negative reviews of the miniseries by noting that "these very limitations account for the show's impact", especially in West Germany, where it was aired over four consecutive nights in January 1979 and coincided with public interest in the Majdanek trials. The viewership was estimated to consist of up to 15 million households or 20 million people, approximately 50% of West Germany's entire adult population. Judt describes the public interest as "enormous".

After each part of Holocaust was aired, a companion show was aired in which a panel of historians answered viewers' questions by telephone. Thousands of shocked and outraged Germans called the panels. The German historian Alf Lüdtke wrote that the historians "could not cope" because thousands of angry viewers asked how such acts had happened. Subsequently, the Gesellschaft für deutsche Sprache ranked the term "Holocaust" as the German Word of the Year for the publicity associated with it.

During an introductory documentary that preceded the first broadcast of the series in Germany, Peter Naumann, then a right-wing terrorist with two accomplices, tried to blow up the transmission towers of the ARD transmitters at Koblenz and near Münster (station Nottuln), to prevent the broadcast. At the Koblenz transmitter, the supply cables were damaged, and the transmitter failed for one hour. Several hundred thousand television viewers could not see the program during this time.  Naumann later became a politician with the NPD.

The Polish community in the United States found the miniseries controversial and inaccurate. It argued against the portrayal of soldiers as Polish military who supervised transports of Jews and killed them during the Warsaw Ghetto Uprising. It noted that many Poles were also killed in the concentration and death camps. Around the world, various unrepentant Nazis also raged against the miniseries: Ernst Zundel led a fierce and unsuccessful attempt to have the show banned from airing in Canada, and a group of American Nazis who were aligned with James K. Warner tried and failed to have NBC grant them a "right of response" which would have granted them equal prime-time coverage to present their "alternate" view of World War II events.

In 1982, during the rule of the military dictatorship of Chile, the series was censored by Televisión Nacional de Chile, beginning a row that ended when its programming director Antonio Vodanovic renounced the channel.

Awards
Holocaust won Emmy Awards for Outstanding Limited Series, as well as acting awards for Meryl Streep, Moriarty, and Blanche Baker. Morton Gould's music score was nominated for an Emmy and a Grammy Award for Best Album of Original Score for a Movie or a Television Program. Co-stars David Warner, Sam Wanamaker, Tovah Feldshuh, Fritz Weaver, and Rosemary Harris were all nominated for, but did not win, Emmys. However, Harris won a Golden Globe Award (for Best TV Actress – Drama) for her performance, as did Moriarty (for Best TV Actor – Drama).

Influence
The series was watched by an estimated 120 million viewers in the United States when it was first broadcast in 1978. In 1979, Holocaust was broadcast in West Germany and it was watched by an estimated 20 million people, then about one-third of the entire population of West Germany. The series is credited with educating many Germans, particularly what was then the younger generation of German people, about the scale of common people's participation in the Holocaust. On its fortieth anniversary, the series was rebroadcast on German television in January 2019. A survey showed that fewer than half of all German school children then had any knowledge of the Auschwitz concentration camp.

In 2020, Alice Agnes Kirchner released an 89-minute documentary, How the Holocaust Came To TV, describing the impact of the broadcast on the German audience in 1979.

See also
 List of Holocaust films
 Warsaw Ghetto Uprising

References

Further reading

External links
 
 
 
 
  Meryl Streep informational website.
 

1978 drama films
1978 American television series debuts
1970s American television miniseries
American war films
Cultural depictions of Heinrich Himmler
Holocaust films
NBC original programming
Peabody Award-winning television programs
Primetime Emmy Award for Outstanding Miniseries winners
Television series based on actual events
Television series by CBS Studios
Television series about the Holocaust
World War II television drama series
American World War II films
Television shows filmed in Austria
Television shows filmed in Germany
Fiction set in 1935
Fiction set in 1938
Fiction set in 1939
Television series set in the 1930s
Television series set in 1943
Television shows set in Berlin
Television shows set in Warsaw
Films directed by Marvin J. Chomsky
1970s American films